South Main Street District is a historic district in Middletown, Ohio.

It contains 76 contributing buildings, including single-dwelling, professional, and specialty store uses.

The district was listed in the National Register of Historic Places in 1974.  It includes the John B. Tytus House, which is a National Historic Landmark.

Notes 

Historic districts on the National Register of Historic Places in Ohio
Historic districts in Butler County, Ohio
National Register of Historic Places in Butler County, Ohio